Benediction is a 2021 biographical romantic drama film written and directed by Terence Davies. It stars Jack Lowden and Peter Capaldi as the war poet Siegfried Sassoon, along with Simon Russell Beale, Jeremy Irvine, Calam Lynch, Kate Phillips, Gemma Jones, and Ben Daniels. It was released in United Kingdom on 20 May 2022 by Vertigo Releasing and United States on 3 June 2022 by Roadside Attractions.

Synopsis
The film follows the life of Siegfried Sassoon, a British poet and decorated W.W.I combat veteran who was sent to a psychiatric facility for his anti-war stance during World War I. He had love affairs with several men during the 1920s, married, had a son, and converted to Catholicism.

Cast

Production
In January 2020, Jack Lowden joined the cast of the film, with Terence Davies directing from a screenplay he had written. In March 2020, Peter Capaldi joined the cast of the film. Principal photography began on 8 September 2020, and finished on 22 October 2020.

Release 
Benediction had its world premiere as a Special Presentation at the 2021 Toronto International Film Festival on 12 September. That same month, the film's UK and Ireland distribution rights were acquired by Vertigo Films. In October 2021, Roadside Attractions acquired North American distribution rights to the film. It was released in United Kingdom on 20 May 2022 and United States on 3 June 2022.

Reception 
On the review aggregator website Rotten Tomatoes, Benediction  has an approval rating of 93% based on 148 reviews, with an average rating of 7.8/10. The site's consensus reads, "It isn't an easy watch, but Benediction uncovers a profoundly affecting drama in the real-life story of a combat veteran whose poetry warned against the horrors of war." Metacritic, which uses a weighted average, assigned the film a score of 81 out of 100 based on 32 critic reviews, indicating "universal acclaim". The IndieWire Critics Poll of 165 critics named it the 13th best film released in 2022.

In response to the film's portrayal of Sassoon's conversion to Catholicism the poet's niece, Sister Jessica Gatty (who attributes her own conversion to Sassoon's influence), repudiated the filmmakers by revealing that he had been both at peace and joyful in his later years, stating: "The redemption which he sought in many different ways and which he longed for, was found in the last decade of his life when he came home to Christ in the Catholic Church. He was transformed. I can witness to this, so I need to speak out."

References

External links
 
 

2021 films
American biographical drama films
British biographical drama films
2021 biographical drama films
2021 LGBT-related films
2021 war drama films
American war drama films
British LGBT-related films
British war drama films
Films about poets
BBC Film films
Films directed by Terence Davies
Roadside Attractions films
2020s American films
2020s British films